Rob (stylized as ¡Rob!) is an American sitcom television series that premiered on CBS on January 12, 2012, at  as a mid-season replacement for Rules of Engagement, and ended on March 1, 2012. The series stars Rob Schneider alongside Cheech Marin, Claudia Bassols, Diana Maria Riva, Eugenio Derbez, Ricky Rico, and Lupe Ontiveros. The show was produced by Two and a Half Mens The Tannenbaum Company and CBS Productions.

On May 13, 2012, CBS canceled the series after one season.

Synopsis
The series follows Rob (Rob Schneider), a former lifelong bachelor and landscape architect with Obsessive Compulsive Disorder, who marries into a tight-knit Mexican American family and attempts to be closer to them, often ending in disastrous results despite his good intentions.

Cast and characters
 Rob Schneider as Rob
 Claudia Bassols as Maggie, Rob's much-younger wife
 Cheech Marin as Fernando, Maggie's cynical father
 Diana Maria Riva as Rosa, Maggie's wise cracking and sarcastic mother who sees through all of Fernando's ploys
 Eugenio Derbez as Hector, Rosa's brother, Maggie's uncle, and the self-proclaimed "best friend" of Rob
 Lupe Ontiveros as Abuelita, Fernando's mother and Maggie's grandmother

Production
The pilot first appeared on CBS's development slate in October 2010. On February 4, 2011, CBS placed a pilot order, written by Rob Schneider and Lew Morton, and directed by Jamie Widdoes. The series' executive producers were Schneider, Morton, and Kim and Eric Tannenbaum. The series then premiered , and concluded on March 1, 2012, after eight episodes.

Episodes

U.S. Nielsen ratings

International broadcast
In Canada, the series airs on Global and premiered on January 19, 2012, after The Office.

Reception
Reviews for Rob were generally unfavorable. Jace Lacob of The Daily Beast described it as CBS's "worst new show" and wrote of the first episode that "there isn’t a single Latin name among the writers or producers" and that it "offers a wafer-thin appreciation and awareness of Mexican culture, one that doesn’t go beyond guacamole and the occasional use of the Spanish endearment mija (my daughter)." Robert Bianco of USA Today wrote in his review that "Some of this barrage of stereotypes might be passable if even one character were intelligently written and skillfully played, but there's hardly a moment or performance in Rob that doesn't reek of the leftover and the second-rate" and that "Schneider's the only actor who even seems to be trying." In a more positive review, Glenn Garvin of The Miami Herald wrote in his review that the show is a "rather funny sitcom about the cultural collisions that occur every day in an increasingly blended America". The show received a 28/100 rating on Metacritic.

Season ratings

References

External links

2010s American sitcoms
2012 American television series debuts
2012 American television series endings
CBS original programming
English-language television shows
Television series by CBS Studios
Television shows set in Los Angeles
Latino sitcoms